Abdourahmane Ndiaye (born 31 December 1996) is a Senegalese professional footballer who plays as a midfielder for French  club Stade Briochin.

Career
Ndiaye helped Pau FC get promoted into the Ligue 2, and extended his contract with them on 6 June 2020. He made his professional debut with Pau in a 3–0 Ligue 2 loss to Valenciennes FC on 22 August 2020.

References

External links
 
 Eurosport Profile

1996 births
Living people
Footballers from Dakar
Senegalese footballers
Association football midfielders
Pau FC players
Stade Briochin players
Ligue 2 players
Championnat National players
Championnat National 3 players
Senegalese expatriate footballers
Senegalese expatriate sportspeople in France
Expatriate footballers in France